Orpingalik was a Netsilik Inuit angakkuq (spiritual healer) and oral poet who provided anthropological input to Danish explorer Knud Rasmussen during the latter's 1921–1924 expedition.

Orpingalik was married to an Inuit woman named Uvlunuaq, also a noted poet. The couple's son Igsivalitaq killed a hunting partner in 1921 and fled his homeland to escape the Royal Canadian Mounted Police.

Works in translation
The Rag and Bone Shop of the Heart: Poems for Men, edited by Robert Bly, James Hillman, and Michael J. Meade, HarperCollins Publishing, 1992. , 9780060167448.

Sources
Penny Petrone. Northern Voices: Inuit Writing in English. University of Toronto Press, 1992. , 9780802077172. Pg 21.

Inuit poets
Inuit spiritual healers
Inuit from the Northwest Territories
Canadian animists
Religious figures of the indigenous peoples of North America
Canadian male poets
People from Kitikmeot Region